Seymour Fagan (born 30 December 1967 in Old Harbour Bay) is a retired male track and field sprinter from Jamaica who specializes in the 400 metres. He won a bronze medal in 4 × 400 metres relay at the 1991 World Championships, together with teammates Patrick O'Connor, Devon Morris and Winthrop Graham.

Achievements

References

1967 births
Living people
People from Saint Catherine Parish
Jamaican male sprinters
Athletes (track and field) at the 1991 Pan American Games
World Athletics Championships medalists
Pan American Games medalists in athletics (track and field)
Pan American Games bronze medalists for Jamaica
Goodwill Games medalists in athletics
Competitors at the 1990 Goodwill Games
Medalists at the 1991 Pan American Games